Vinderup station is a railway station serving the railway town of Vinderup in Jutland, Denmark.

Vinderup station is located on the Langå-Struer Line from Langå to Struer. The station was opened in 1865 with the opening of the Skive-Struer section of the Langå-Struer Line. It offers direct InterCity services to Copenhagen and Struer as well as regional train services to Aarhus and Struer. The train services are operated by Arriva and DSB with trains going approximately one time each hour all week days.

History 
Vinderup station was opened on 17 November 1865 with the opening of the Skive-Struer section of the Langå-Struer Line. In 1974 the station was closed but continues as a railway halt.

References

Citations

Bibliography

External links

 Banedanmark – government agency responsible for maintenance and traffic control of most of the Danish railway network
 DSB – largest Danish train operating company
 Arriva – British multinational public transport company operating bus and train services in Denmark
 Danske Jernbaner – website with information on railway history in Denmark

Railway stations opened in 1865
Railway stations in the Central Denmark Region
Heinrich Wenck railway stations
Railway stations in Denmark opened in the 19th century